The Ultimate Collection is a box set by American singer and recording artist Michael Jackson. It was released on November 16, 2004, by Epic Records and consists of four audio CDs and one DVD. The album sold 57,000 copies in 2004 alone, and on May 16, 2013, it was certified Platinum as a multi-disk package by the Recording Industry Association of America (RIAA) for physical shipments of 200,000 copies in the United States. The DVD marked the first physical release of Live in Bucharest: The Dangerous Tour, initially an HBO concert special in 1992, which was later released as an individual title on July 25, 2005. The set also features a 60-page booklet that contains photos and text by the American music critic Nelson George summarizing the artist's career.

Album information
Much of the music is drawn from the height of Jackson's career, particularly from the studio albums released by Epic: Off the Wall, Thriller, Bad, Dangerous, HIStory: Past, Present and Future, Book I, and Invincible, plus the remix album Blood on the Dance Floor: HIStory in the Mix.

Notable tracks on the box set include the first release of the demos of songs such as "P.Y.T. (Pretty Young Thing)", "Shake Your Body (Down to the Ground)", "Cheater" and the original demo of "We Are the World" featuring Jackson as a soloist. The set also contains 8 unreleased songs, including "In the Back", "Beautiful Girl", "The Way You Love Me" and "We've Had Enough".

The song "The Way You Love Me" was remixed for the posthumous album Michael with the title "(I Like) The Way You Love Me", and was released as a single on July 8, 2011.

The previously unreleased content from this box set was later included in an iTunes-only collection similarly titled The Ultimate Fan Extras Collection in 2013.

Rarities
The Ultimate Collection box set also contains songs previously out of print:
 "Enjoy Yourself" is 15 seconds longer than the original album version.
 The full version of "You Can't Win" was originally only available on its 12-inch single.
 "Sunset Driver" was originally recorded in 1979 and 1982 (the 1979 version remains unreleased), was left off the Thriller album.
 "Someone in the Dark" was recorded in 1982 and first released as a two-part song on the E.T. the Extra-Terrestrial double LP audiobook, and later included in a shorter version in the 2001 "Special Edition" of Thriller.
 Both the early version of "Dangerous" and "Monkey Business" were recorded in 1989 and were previously available only on the rare 2001 Special Edition acetate of the Dangerous album, which was ultimately cancelled.
 "Someone Put Your Hand Out" was originally recorded in 1987 and re-recorded in 1991. The song was released as a Pepsi-supported cassette single in Europe to promote the Dangerous World Tour (see below).
 "On the Line" was recorded in 1996 and featured on the Get on the Bus movie released the same year. It was also part of the Ghosts boxset released in 1997, but containing an earlier fade out.
 "You Are Not Alone" is 15 seconds longer than the album version, featuring more vocals.
 "We Are Here to Change the World" is a previously unreleased song recorded in 1985 and used in the Disney World short film Captain EO.
 "Scared of the Moon" was recorded in 1984 in the pre-Bad sessions.
Michael recorded a demo of We Are the World in 1984 with his vocals only.
 Cheater was recorded in 1987 during the Bad sessions and reworked in 2001. The 2001 rework remains unreleased.
 Fall Again was recorded in 1999 during the early Invincible sessions.
 "In The Back" was recorded between 1994 and 2004 in the Invincible sessions.
 "Beautiful Girl" was recorded in 1998 and 2004 in the Invincible sessions.
 (I Like) The Way You Love Me was recorded between 1998 and 1999 during the Invincible sessions. A reworked version was released on Michael.
 "We've Had Enough" was recorded between 1999 and 2000 during the Invincible sessions.

Track listing

 The Jackson 5/Jacksons perform tracks 1-3, 7, 8, 11-12, 18-19 (Disc 1) and track 8 (Disc 2).

Limited Japanese Edition bonus tracks

 The Jacksons perform track 11 on Disc 1.
 The addition of "Another Part of Me" pushes the order of tracks down by one (i.e. "Someone Put Your Hand Out" starts off Disc 4).

Sampler CD

 The Jackson 5 perform track 1.

"Someone Put Your Hand Out"
"Someone Put Your Hand Out" (on disc three of The Ultimate Collection) is a song originally written by Michael Jackson in 1987 for the Bad album and re-written in April 1992 with Teddy Riley, having failed to make it on to Jackson's 1991 album Dangerous. It was released May 1992 in Europe as an exclusive Pepsi promotional single, to promote Jackson's upcoming Dangerous World Tour. 500,000 copies were made available by collecting a winning token from certain Pepsi products.

A cassette single of "Someone Put Your Hand Out" was also released as part of an exclusive Pepsi promotional pack in June 1992 throughout Europe. The promotional pack also included a Michael Jackson poster, a promotional sticker, and a press release about Jackson's upcoming Dangerous World Tour.

An instrumental version of the song was played by Michael Jackson's band during some of the concerts of the Dangerous World Tour.

The Bad-era demo leaked in high quality with alternate lyrics on 28 January 2023.

Charts

Certifications and sales

References

2004 compilation albums
Michael Jackson compilation albums
Albums produced by Michael Jackson
Epic Records compilation albums